Trechicomimus is a genus of beetles in the family Carabidae, containing the following species:

 Trechicomimus aphaenops Mateu & Negre, 1972
 Trechicomimus suturalis Ueno, 1977

References

Trechinae